

B

 B. Monkey (1998)
 B.A.P.S. (1997)

Ba

Baa

 Baa Baa Land (2017)
 Baa Baaa Black Sheep (2018)
 Baa Baaro Rasika (2004)
 Baa Nalle Madhuchandrake (1993)
 Baa Nanna Preethisu (1992)
 Baabarr (2009)
 Baabul (2006)
 Baadada Hoo (1982)
 Baadasssss! (2004)
 BaadAsssss Cinema (2002)
 Baadal: (1951 & 1985)
 Baadbaan (1954)
 Baader (2002)
 The Baader Meinhof Complex (2008)
 Baadshah: (1999 & 2013)
 Baadshaho (2017)
 Baaghi: (1990 & 2000)
 Baaghi series:
 Baaghi (2016)
 Baaghi 2 (2018)
 Baaghi 3 (2020)
 Baaghi- Ek Yoddha (2019)
 Baagyavathi (1957)
 Baahubali series:
 Baahubali: The Beginning (2015)
 Baahubali 2: The Conclusion (2017)
 Baaja (2002)
 Baaje Ghungroo (1962)
 Baaji (2019)
 Baal (1970)
 Baala Bandana (1971)
 Baalaraajana Kathe (1965)
 Baali Umar Ko Salaam (1994)
 Baalu Belagithu (1970)
 Baalu Jenu (1976)
 Baalyaprathijna (1972)
 Baana Kaathadi (2010)
 Baanaadi (2014)
 Baanam (2009)
 Baandhon (2012)
 Baankey Ki Crazy Baraat (2015)
 Baantjer, de film: De Cock en de wraak zonder einde (1999 TV)
 Baap Beti (1954)
 Baap Ji (TBD)
 Baap Numbri Beta Dus Numbri (1990)
 Baap Re Baap: (1955 & 2019)
 Baap Re Baap Dokyala Taap (2008)
 Baaraige Fas (2009)
 Baaram (2018)
 Baari (2015)
 Baari Tar Bangla (2014)
 Baarish (1957)
 Baarìa (2009)
 Baashha (1995)
 Baat Ban Jaye (1986)
 Baat Bann Gayi (2013)
 Baat Cheet (2015)
 Baat Ek Raat Ki (1962)
 Baat Hai Pyaar Ki (1991)
 Baava (2010)
 Baava Baamaida (2001)
 Baavra Mann (2013)
 Baawri (1982)
 Baaz: (1953 & 1992)
 Baaz: A Bird in Danger (2003)
 Baazaar (2018)
 Baazi: (1951, 1968, 1984, 1995 & 2021)
 Baazigar (1993)

Bab

 Baba (2002)
 Baba Joon (2015)
 Baba Kalyani (2006)
 Baba Luba (1995)
 Baba Ramdev (1963)
 Baba Sathya Sai (TBD)
 Baba Yaga (1973)
 Baba Yaga is against! (1979) 
 Baba Yaga: Terror of the Dark Forest (2020)
 The Babadook (2014)
 Babai (2015)
 Babai Abbai (1985)
 Babai Hotel (1992)
 Babaing Hampaslupa (1988)
 Babak and Friends (2005)
 Baban (2018)
 Babang Luksa (2011)
 Babar: King of the Elephants (1999)
 Babar: The Movie (1989)
 Babar Naam Gandhiji (2015)
 Babatu (1976)
 Babayaran Mo ng Dugo (1989)
 Babbitt: (1924 & 1934)
 Babe (series):
 Babe (1995)
 Babe: Pig in the City (1998)
 The Babe (1992)
 Babe Comes Home (1927)
 Babe, I Hate to Go (2017)
 Babe, I Love You (2010)
 Babe Ruth (1991 TV)
 Babe's & Rickey's Inn (2013)
 Babe's School Days (1915)
 Babek (1979)
 Babel (2006)
 Babenco: Tell Me When I Die (2019)
 Babes in Arms (1939)
 Babes in Bagdad (1952)
 Babes on Broadway (1941)
 Babes a GoGo (1956)
 Babes at Sea (1934)
 Babes on Swing Street (1944)
 Babes in Toyland: (1934, 1961, 1986 & 1997)
 Babes in the Woods (1932)
 Babette (1917)
 Babette Goes to War (1959) 
 Babette's Feast (1988)
 Babicka (2003)
 Babičky dobíjejte přesně! (1984)
 Babies (2010)
 Babies for Sale (1940)
 Babilonia (1987)
 Babina (2000)
 Babine (2008)
 Babiy Yar (2003)
 Babloo (2011)
 Babloo Bachelor (2020)
 Babloo Happy Hai (2014)
 Bablusha (2016)
 BABO (2008)
 Baboo Band Baaja (2012)
 Babruvahana: (1964 & 1977)
 Babs: (1920, 2000 & 2017)
 Babu: (1971, 1975 & 1985)
 Babu Baga Busy (2017)
 Babu Bangaram (2016)
 Babu I Love You (2005)
 Babuji Ek Ticket Bambai (2017)
 Babul (1950)
 Babul Ki Galiyaan (1972)
 Babulugaadi Debba (1981)
 Babumon (1975)
 Babumoshai Bandookbaaz (2017)
 Baby: (1915, 2000 TV, 2002, 2007, 2010, 2015 Hindi, 2015 Tamil & 2016)
 The Baby (1973)
 Baby Blood (1990)
 Baby Blue Marine (1976)
 Baby Blues: (1941, 2008 & 2012)
 Baby on Board (2009)
 Baby Boom (1987)
 Baby Bottleneck (1946)
 Baby Boy (2001)
 Baby of the Bride (1991 TV)
 Baby Brokers (1994 TV)
 Baby Brother (1927)
 Baby Buggy Bunny (1954)
 Baby Bumps (2017)
 Baby Cakes (1989 TV)
 Baby Clothes (1926)
 Baby Doll: (1916 & 1956)
 Baby Done (2020)
 Baby Driver (2017)
 Baby Face (1933)
 Baby Face Harrington (1935)
 Baby Face Morgan (1942)
 Baby Face Nelson (1957)
 Baby Geniuses (1999)
 Baby God (2020)
 Baby Hands (1912)
 Baby Huey's Great Easter Adventure (1998)
 Baby and I (2008)
 Baby It's You (1983)
 Baby Love: (1968 & 2008)
 The Baby of Mâcon (1993)
 Baby Mama (2008)
 Baby Mine: (1917 & 1928)
 Baby the Rain Must Fall (1965)
 Baby for Sale (2004 TV)
 Baby: Secret of the Lost Legend (1985)
 Baby Sellers (2013 TV)
 Baby Sister (1983 TV)
 Baby Sitters Jitters (1951)
 Baby Snakes (1979)
 Baby Snatcher (1992 TV)
 Baby, Sorry (2015)
 Baby, Take a Bow (1934)
 Baby Thief (1991)
 Baby's Day Out (1994)
 Baby's Toilet (1905)
 The Baby-Sitters Club (1995)
 Babyfever (1994)
 Babylon: (1980 & 2022)
 Babylon 5 series:
 Babylon 5: In the Beginning (1998) (TV)
 Babylon 5: The Legend of the Rangers (2002) (TV)
 Babylon 5: Thirdspace (1998) (TV)
 Babylon A.D. (2008)
 The Babysitter: (1980, 1995 & 2017)
 The Babysitter: Killer Queen (2020)
 Babysitter Massacre (2013)
 Babysitter Wanted (2008)
 The Babysitters (2007)
 Babysitting (2014)
 Babysitting 2 (2015)
 Babyteeth (2019)

Bac

 Baccara (1935)
 Baccarat (1919)
 Baccha Shoshur (2019)
 Bach and Broccoli (1986)
 Bach the Detective (1936)
 Bach the Millionaire (1933)
 Bach's Fight for Freedom (1995 TV)
 Bachaana (2016)
 Bachana Chahane Haru (1982)
 Bachchan: (2013 & 2014)
 Bachchan Pandey (2022)
 Bachche Kachche Sachche (2017)
 Bachchon Ka Khel (1946)
 Bachelor (2004)
 The Bachelor: (1955, 1990 & 1999)
 Bachelor Apartment (1931)
 Bachelor of Arts (1934)
 Bachelor Bait (1934)
 The Bachelor and the Bobby-Soxer (1947)
 Bachelor Brides (1926)
 Bachelor Daddy (1941)
 Bachelor Father (1939)
 Bachelor Flat (1962)
 Bachelor Games (2016)
 Bachelor Girl (1988 TV)
 Bachelor Girls (2016)
 Bachelor Mother: (1932 & 1939)
 Bachelor in Paradise (1961)
 Bachelor Party: (1984 & 2012)
 Bachelor Party 2: The Last Temptation (2008)
 Bachelor Party Vegas (2006)
 Bachelor's Affairs (1932)
 Bachelor's Baby (1932)
 Bachelor's Paradise: (1928 & 1939)
 Bachelorette (2012)
 Bachelors' Love (2013)
 Bachi (2000)
 Bachiatari Bōryoku Ningen (2010)
 Bachke Rehna Re Baba (2005)
 Bachna Ae Haseeno (2008)
 Bachpan: (1945 & 1970)
 Baciato dalla fortuna (2011)
 Back to 1942 (2012)
 Back to 1989 (2016)
 Back Alley Oproar (1948)
 Back to Bataan (1945)
 Back to the Beach (1987)
 Back of Beyond (1995)
 Back in Business: (1997 & 2007)
 Back in Circulation (1937)
 Back in Crime (2013)
 Back in the Day: (2005, 2014 & 2016)
 Back from the Dead (1957)
 Back Door Channels: The Price of Peace (2009)
 Back Door to Heaven (1939)
 Back Door to Hell (1964)
 Back from Eternity (1956)
 Back Fire (1922)
 Back and Forth (1969)
 Back at the Front (1952)
 Back from the Front (1943)
 Back to the Future series:
 Back to the Future (1985)
 Back to the Future Part II (1989)
 Back to the Future Part III (1990)
 Back from Hell (1992)
 Back Home and Broke (1922)
 Back Long Ago (1969)
 Back of the Medal (1965)
 Back by Midnight (2002)
 Back of the Net (2019)
 Back Pay: (1922 & 1930)
 Back Roads: (1981 & 2018)
 Back-Room Boy (1942)
 Back in the Saddle (1941)
 Back to School (1986)
 Back to School with Franklin (2003)
 Back in the Seventies (1945)
 Back Stage: (1917, 1919 & 1923)
 Back Street: (1932, 1941 & 1961)
 Back Street Girls: Gokudols (2019)
 Back Streets of Paris (1946)
 Back Then (1943)
 Back in Time (2015)
 Back Trail (1948)
 Back on Track (2013)
 Back in Trouble (1997)
 Back in the USSR (1992)
 The Back-up Plan (2010)
 Backbeat (1994)
 Backcountry (2014)
 Backdraft (1991)
 Backkom Bear: Agent 008 (2017)
 Backlash: (1956 & 1986)
 Backroads: (1977 & 1997)
 Backtrack (2015)
 The Backwoods (2006)
 Bacon Grabbers (1929)
 Bacurau (2019)

Bad

 Bad 25 (2007)
 The Bad and the Beautiful (1952)
 Bad Boy: (1935, 1939 & 1949)
 Bad Boy Bubby (1993)
 Bad Boys: (1961, 1983 & 2014)
 Bad Boys series: 
 Bad Boys (1995)
 Bad Boys II (2003)
 Bad Boys for Life (2020)
 Bad Candy (2020)
 Bad Company: (1925, 1931, 1946, 1972, 1980, 1986, 1995, 1999 & 2002)
 Bad Day at Black Rock (1955)
 Bad Dreams (1988)
 Bad Education: (2004 & 2019)
 The Bad Education Movie (2015)
 Bad Eggs (2003)
 Bad Genius (2017)
 Bad Girl: (1931, 1963 & 2012) 
 Bad Girls: (1994, 2007 & 2012)
 Bad Guy: (1937 & 2001)
 The Bad Guys (2022)
 Bad Guys Always Die (2015)
 The Bad Guys: Reign of Chaos (2019)
 Bad Hair Day (2015)
 Bad Influence (1990)
  Bad Kids series:
 Bad Kids Go to Hell (2012)
 Bad Kids of Crestview Academy (2017)
 The Bad Lands (1925)
 Bad Lieutenant (1992)
 Bad Lieutenant: Port of Call New Orleans (2009)
 The Bad Man: (1923, 1930 & 1941)
 Bad Man's Bluff (1926)
 Bad Man's River (1971)
 Bad Moms (2016)
 A Bad Moms Christmas (2017)
 Bad Moon: (1996 & 2005)
 The Bad News Bears series:
 The Bad News Bears (1976)
 The Bad News Bears in Breaking Training (1977)
 The Bad News Bears Go to Japan (1978)
 Bad News Bears (2005)
 Bad Samaritan (2018)
 Bad Santa (2003)
 Bad Santa 2 (2016)
 The Bad Seed: (1956 & 1985)
 Bad Sister (2014)
 The Bad Sleep Well (1960)
 Bad Tales (2020)
 Bad Taste (1987)
 Bad Teacher (2011)
 Bad Times at the El Royale (2018)
 Bad Timing (1980)
 Bad Words (2013)
 Badal (2000)
 Bade Miyan Chote Miyan (1998)
 The Badge (2002)
 Badge 373 (1973)
 Badger's Green: (1934 & 1949)
 The Badlanders (1958)
 Badlands (1973)

Baf-Bam

 Bafana (2006)
 Baffled! (1973 TV)
 Bag and Baggage (1923)
 Bag Boy Lover Boy (2014)
 Bag of the Collector (1979)
 Bag It (2010)
 Bag Københavns kulisser (1935)
 Baga Beach (2013)
 Bagavathi (2002)
 Bagdad (1949)
 Bagdad Cafe (1987)
 Bageecha (2018)
 Baggage Claim (2013)
 Bagh Bahadur (1989)
 Bagh Bondi Khela (1975)
 Baghaawat – Ek Jung (2001)
 Baghavat (1982)
 Baghban: (1938 & 2003)
 Baghdad or Bust (2004)
 Baghdad ER (2006)
 Baghdad Gaja Donga (1968)
 Baghdad Ka Chor (1946)
 Baghdad Perazhagi (1973)
 Baghdad Texas (2009)
 Baghdad Thirudan (1960)
 Baghead (2008)
 Baghi Sipahi: (1936, 1958 & 1986)
 Baghini: (1968 & 2019)
 Bagi, the Monster of Mighty Nature (1985)
 Bah, Humduck! A Looney Tunes Christmas (2006)
 Baharen Phir Bhi Aayengi (1966)
 Baignade en mer (1896)
 Baiju Bawra (1952)
 Baise-moi (2000)
 Bait: (1950, 2000 & 2019)
 The Bait: (1973 TV & 1995)
 Bajirao Mastani (2015)
 The Baker's Wife (1938)
 The Bakery Girl of Monceau (1962)
 Balala the Fairies: Princess Camellia (2016)
 The Balcony (1963)
 Ball of Fire (1941)
 The Ball Game (1898)
 The Ballad of Buster Scruggs (2018)
 The Ballad of Cable Hogue (1970)
 Ballad of the Cart (1959)
 The Ballad of Gregorio Cortez (1982)
 The Ballad of Jack and Rose (2005)
 The Ballad of Narayama: (1958 & 1983) 
 The Ballad of the Sad Café (1991)
 Ballad of a Soldier (1959)
 Ballet Mécanique (1924)
 Ballistic: Ecks vs. Sever (2002)
 The Balloonatic (1923)
 Ballot Box Bunny (1951)
 The Ballroom (2007)
 The Ballroom of Romance (1986)
 Balls of Fury (2007)
 Balthazar (1966)
 Baltic Storm (2003)
 Balto series:
 Balto (1995)
 Balto II: Wolf Quest (2002)
 Balto III: Wings of Change (2004)
 Balu (2005)
 Balyasakhi (1954)
 Balzac and the Little Chinese Seamstress (2002)
 Bambi (1942)
 Bambi II (2006)
 Bambi Meets Godzilla (1969)
 Bamboozled (2000)

Ban

 Banal (2019)
 Banana (2015)
 Banana Club (1996)
 Banana Joe (1982)
 Banana Peel (1963)
 Banana Ridge (1942)
 Banana Split (2018)
 The Banana Splits Movie (2019)
 Banana da Terra (1939)
 Bananas (1971)
 Bananas Unpeeled (2000)
 Bananaz (2008)
 Bananes mécaniques (1973)
 Banaras: (2006, 2009 & 2022)
 Banarasi Babu: (1973 & 1997)
 Banarsi Thug (1962)
 Banashankari (1977)
 Banat (2015)
 Banaz: A Love Story (2012)
 Band Aid (2017)
 Band Baaja Baaraat (2010)
 Band and Battalion of the U.S. Indian School (1901)
 Band of the Hand (1986)
 Band Master (1993)
 Band of Outsiders (1964)
 Band Toh Baje Ga (2018 TV)
 Band Waggon (1940)
 The Band Wagon (1953)
 The Band's Visit (2007)
 Bandidas (2006)
 Bandini (1963)
 Bandit Queen (1994)
 The Bandit of Sherwood Forest (1946)
 Bandits: (1997 & 2001)
 Bandolero! (1968)
 Bandslam (2009)
 Bang Bang You're Dead (2002)
 Bang the Drum Slowly (1973)
 Bangaaradha Manushya (1970)
 The Banger Sisters (2002)
 Bangers (1999)
 Bangkok Dangerous: (1999 & 2008)
 Bangkok Haunted (2001)
 Bangkok Loco (2004)
 Bangkok Love Story (2007)
 The Banishing (2020)
 Banjo: (1947 & 2016)
 Banjo the Woodpile Cat (1979)
 The Bank Dick (1940)
 The Bank Job (2008)
 The Banker: (2015 & 2020)
 The Banquet: (1991 & 2006)

Bao-Bar

 Bao (2018)
 Baober in Love (2004)
 Bapi Bari Jaa (2012)
 Baptism of Blood (2006)
 Baptism of Fire (1943)
 Baptists at Our Barbecue (2004)
 The Bar (2017)
 Bar 20 (1943)
 Bar 20 Justice (1938)
 Bar 20 Rides Again (1935)
 Bar 51 (1986) 
 Bar-B-Que Movie (1988)
 Bar Hopping (2002)
 Bar Boys (2017)
 Bar Girls (1994)
 Bar Sport (2011)
 Bar-Z Bad Men (1937)
 Bara (1982)
 Bara no Konrei ~Mayonaka ni Kawashita Yakusoku~ (2002)
 Barabbas: (1953, 1961 & 2012)
 Baraka (1992)
 Barakah Meets Barakah (2016)
 Barakat! (2006)
 Baran (2001)
 Barat (1942)
 Barata Ribeiro, 716 (2016)
 Barati (1954)
 Barb and Star Go to Vista Del Mar (2021)
 Barb Wire: (1922 & 1996)
 Barbados Quest (1955)
 Barbara: (1961, 1997, 2012 & 2017)
 Bárbara (1980)
 Barbara the Fair with the Silken Hair (1969)
 Barbara Frietchie: (1915 & 1924)
 Barbarella (1968)
 Barbarian (2022)
 The Barbarian: (1920 & 1933)
 The Barbarian Invasions (2003)
 Barbarian Queen (1985)
 Barbarians (1953)
 Barbarians of the Bay (2019)
 Barabarians at the Gate (1993 TV)
 Barbarossa (2009)
 Barbary Coast (1935)
 Barbary Coast Bunny (1956)
 Barbary Coast Gent (1944)
 Barbary Pirate (1949)
 Barbary Sheep (1917)
 Barbecue (2014)
 Barbed Wire: (1927 & 1952)
 The Barber (2014)
 The Barber of the Poor Quarter (1982)
 The Barber of Seville: (1904, 1933, 1938, 1944, 1947, 1948 & 1958 TV)
 Barber's Tales (2013)
 Berberian Sound Studio (2012)
 Barbershop series:
 Barbershop (2002)
 Barbershop: The Next Cut (2016)
 Barbershop 2: Back in Business (2004)
 Barbie series:
 Barbie in the Nutcracker (2001)
 Barbie as Rapunzel (2002)
 Barbie of Swan Lake (2003)
 Barbie as the Princess and the Pauper (2004)
 Barbie: Fairytopia (2005)
 Barbie and the Magic of Pegasus (2005)
 Barbie: Mermaidia (2006)
 The Barbie Diaries (2006)
 Barbie in the 12 Dancing Princesses (2006)
 Barbie as the Island Princess (2007)
 Barbie Mariposa (2008)
 Barbie & the Diamond Castle (2008)
 Barbie Thumbelina (2009)
 Barbie and the Three Musketeers (2009)
 Barbie in A Mermaid Tale (2010)
 Barbie: A Fashion Fairytale (2010)
 Barbie: A Fairy Secret (2011)
 Barbie: Princess Charm School (2011)
 Barbie in A Mermaid Tale 2 (2012)
 Barbie: The Princess & the Popstar (2012)
 Barbie and the Secret Door (2014)
 Barbie: Star Light Adventure (2016)
 Barbie: Dolphin Magic (2017)
 Barbie (2023)
 Barcelona (1994)
 Barcelona: A Love Untold (2016)
 Barcelone, Parc au crépuscule (1904)
 Bardelys the Magnificent (1926)
 Bardo (2016)
 Bardo, False Chronicle of a Handful of Truths (2022)
 Bare (2015)
 Bare Behind Bars (1980)
 Bare Essentials (1991 TV)
 Bare-Fisted Gallagher (1919)
 Bare Fists (1919)
 Bare Knuckles (1977)
 Bare på jobb (2003)
 Baree, Son of Kazan: (1918 & 1925)
 Barefoot: (2005 & 2014)
 Barefoot in Athens (1966 TV)
 Barefoot Boy (1938)
 The Barefoot Contessa (1954)
 Barefoot at Dawn (2017)
 Barefoot to Goa (2015)
 Barefoot to Herat (2002)
 Barefoot to Jerusalem (2008)
 Barefoot Ki-bong (2006)
 Barefoot in the Park (1967)
 Barefoot Savage (1952)
 Barefoot Sultan (1956)
 Barefooted Youth (1964)
 Bareilly Ki Barfi (2017)
 Barely Legal (2011)
 Barely Lethal (2015)
 Barenaked in America (1999)
 Barfi! (2012)
 Barfly (1987)
 Barfuss (2005)
 Bargain with Bullets (1937)
 Bargain Day (1931)
 Bari Theke Paliye (1958)
 Baring It All (2011)
 Barista (2015)
 Baristas (2019)
 Bark! (2002)
 Barke (2014)
 Barkha (1959)
 Barkha Bahar (1973)
 Barkhaa (2015)
 Barking Dogs Never Bite (2000)
 Barking at the Stars (1998)
 Barking Water (2009)
 The Barkleys of Broadway (1949)
 Barmaid (1922)
 The Barn (2016)
 Barn av solen (1955)
 Barn Burning (1980)
 Barnabé (1938)
 Barnaby Lee (1917)
 Barnaby and Me (1978 TV)
 Barnaby Rudge (1915)
 Barnacle Bill: (1930, 1935, 1941 & 1957)
 Barnen från Frostmofjället (1945)
 Barnet Horse Fair (1896)
 Barney's Great Adventure (1998)
 Barney's Version (2010)
 Barnyard (2006)
 The Barnyard (1923)
 The Baron of Arizona (1950)
 Baron Blood (1972)
 Barque sortant du port (1895)
 Barrabas (1920)
 The Barretts of Wimpole Street: (1934 & 1957)
 Barry: (1949 & 2016)
 Barry Lyndon (1975)
 Barsaat: (1949 & 1995)
 Barsaat Ki Ek Raat (1981)
 Bart Got a Room (2009)
 Bartleby: (1970, 1976 & 2001)
 Bartok the Magnificent (1999)
 Barton Fink (1991)

Bas

 Bas Ek Chance (2015)
 Bas Ek Pal (2006)
 Bas Itna Sa Khwaab Hai (2001)
 Bas Yun Hi (2003)
 Basant (1942)
 Basant Bahar (1956)
 Basanta Bilap (1973)
 Bansata Utsav (2013)
 Banshee Chapter (2013)
 The Banshees of Inisherin (2022)
 Basanti (2000)
 Basanti Tangewali (1992)
 Baseball Bugs (1946)
 Baseball Girl (2019)
 Baseball Punx (2017)
 Based Down South (2010)
 Based on the Novel (1999)
 Based on a True Story (2017)
 BASEketball (1998)
 Basement: (2010 (2010), 2014) (2014) & The Basement (2017)
 Basement Jack (2009)
 Bashful (1917)
 Bashful Anton (1940)
 Bashful Buccaneer (1925)
 Bashful Felix (1934)
 Bashing (2005)
 Bashu, the Little Stranger (1986)
 Basic (2003)
 Basic Instinct (1992)
 Basic Instinct 2 (2006)
 Basic Love (2009)
 Basket Case series:
 Basket Case (1982)
 Basket Case 2 (1990)
 Basket Case 3: The Progeny (1992)
 The Basketball Diaries (1995)
 Basquiat (1996)
 Bastard: (1940 & 1997)
 The Bastard: (1954, 1963 & 1978 TV) 
 Bastard Out of Carolina (1996)
 Bastards: (2006 & 2013)
 Bastille Day: (1933 & 2016)

Bat

 The Bat: (1926 & 1959)
 The Bat People (1974)
 Bat Pussy (1970s)
 Bat Thumb (2001)
 The Bat Whispers (1930)
 Bat Wings (1992)
 Bat*21 (1988)
 Bataan (1943)
 Bataille de boules de neige (1896)
 A Batalha do Passinho (2012)
 Batas Militar (1997)
 Batch '81 (1982)
 Bateau-mouche sur la Seine (1896)
 Bates Motel (1987 TV)
 The Bath in the Barn: (1943 & 1956)
 A Bath House Beauty (1914)
 Bath Salt Zombies (2013)
 Bathing Beauty (1944)
 Bathing Buddies (1946)
 Bathing Franky (2012)
 Bathory (2008)
 Bathtime in Clerkenwell (2002)
 The Bathtub (2016)
 Bathtubs Over Broadway (2018)
 Batman series:
 Batman Dracula (1964)
 Batman: (1966 & 1989)
 Batman Fights Dracula (1967)
 Batman Returns (1992)
 Batman: Mask of the Phantasm (1993)
 Batman Forever (1995)
 Batman & Robin (1997)
 Batman & Mr. Freeze: SubZero (1998)
 Batman Beyond: Return of the Joker (2000)
 Batman: Mystery of the Batwoman (2003)
 Batman Begins (2005)
 The Batman vs. Dracula (2005)
 Batman: New Times (2005)
 Batman: Gotham Knight (2008)
 Batman: Under the Red Hood (2010)
 Batman: Year One (2011)
 Batman: Assault on Arkham (2014)
 Batman Unlimited: Animal Instincts (2015)
 Batman Unlimited: Monster Mayhem (2015)
 Batman: Bad Blood (2016)
 Batman: The Killing Joke (2016)
 Batman v Superman: Dawn of Justice (2016)
 Batman Unlimited: Mechs vs. Mutants (2016)
 Batman: Return of the Caped Crusaders (2016)
 Batman and Harley Quinn (2017)
 Batman vs. Two-Face (2017)
 Batman: Gotham by Gaslight (2018)
 Batman Ninja (2018)
 Batman: Hush (2019)
 Batman vs. Teenage Mutant Ninja Turtles (2019)
 Batman: The Long Halloween, Part One (2021)
 Batman: The Long Halloween, Part Two (2021)
 The Batman (2022)
 Bato sa Buhangin (1976)
 Bato: The General Ronald dela Rosa Story (2019)
 Baton Baton Mein (1979)
 Baton Bunny (1959)
 Bats (1999)
 Bats in the Belfry (1942)
 Bats: Human Harvest (2007)
 Batsu Game 2 (2012)
 Battal Gazi Destanı (1971)
 Battalion: (1927, 1937 & 2015)
 Battalion 609 (2019)
 The Battalion in the Shadows (1957)
 Battered (1989 TV)
 The Battered Bastards of Baseball (2014)
 Batteries Not Included (1987)
 The Battery (2012)
 Batteuse à vapeur (1896)
 The Battle: (1911, 1923 & 1934)
 The Battle Against Berlin (1926)
 The Battle of Algiers (1966)
 The Battle at Apache Pass (1952)
 The Battle of Bademunde (1931)
 The Battle for Barking (2010)
 The Battle Between the Burps and Farts (2004)
 Battle Beyond the Stars (1980)
 Battle Beyond the Sun (1959)
 The Battle of Bhima Koregaon (2022)
 The Battle of Bhima Koregaon: An Unending Journey (2017)
 Battle of Blood Island (1960)
 The Battle of Brains (1941)
 Battle of Britain (1969)
 Battle of the Bulge: (1965 & 1991)
 The Battle of the Bulge... The Brave Rifles (1965)
 The Battle of Bull Run (1913)
 The Battle of the Century (1927)
 Battle Circus (1953)
 Battle Cry (1955)
 The Battle Cry of Peace (1915)
 The Battle of El Alamein (1969)
 The Battle at Elderbush Gulch (1913)
 The Battle and Fall of Przemysl (1915)
 The Battle of Frenchman's Run (1915)
 The Battle of Gettysburg: (1913 & 1955)
 Battle for Haditha (2007)
 The Battle of the Harvests (1942)
 The Battle of Hearts (1916)
 Battle in Heaven (2005)
 The Battle of Hong Kong (1942)
 Battle Hymn (1957)
 The Battle of Jangsari (2019)
 The Battle of Kerzhenets (1971)
 The Battle for L.A.: Footsoldiers, Vol. 1 (2004)
 The Battle at Lake Changjin (2021)
 The Battle at Lake Changjin II (2022)
 The Battle of London (1941)
 Battle of Los Angeles (2011)
 The Battle of Love's Return (1971)
 Battle of Memories (2017)
 The Battle of Midway (1942)
 The Battle for Oil (1942)
 The Battle Over Citizen Kane (1996 TV)
 The Battle of Paris (1929)
 Battle for the Planet of the Apes (1973)
 The Battle of Port Arthur (1980)
 The Battle of the Rails (1946)
 The Battle for the Republic of China (1981)
 The Battle of the River Plate (1956)
 The Battle of Rogue River (1954)
 The Battle Royal (1916)
 Battle Royale (2000)
 Battle Royale II: Requiem (2003)
 The Battle of San Pietro (1945)
 Battle in Seattle (2007)
 Battle of the Sexes: (1920, 1926 & 2017)
 The Battle of the Sexes: (1914, 1928 & 1959)
 The Battle of Shaker Heights (2003)
 The Battle of Sinai (1968)
 The Battle of the Somme (1916)
 Battle for Soviet Ukraine (1943)
 The Battle of Stalingrad (1949)
 Battle for Terra (2007)
 The Battle of the Three Kings (1990)
 The Battle of Trafalgar (1911)
 The Battle of the Villa Fiorita (1965)
 The Battle of Waterloo (1913)
 A Battle of Wits: (1912 & 2006)
 The Battle Wizard (1977)
 Battle: Los Angeles (2011)
 The Battle: Roar to Victory (2019)
 Battlefield Earth (2000)
 Battleground (1949)
 The Battles of Coronel and Falkland Islands (1927)
 Battles Without Honor and Humanity (1973)
 Battleship (2012)
 The Battleship Island (2017)
 The Battleship Potemkin (1925)
 Battlestar Galactica (1979)
 The Battling Orioles (1924)
 Batuque, the Soul of a People (2006)
 Batya (2021)

Bau-Baz

 Bau Na Vichar (2019)
 Bauern erfüllen den Plan (1952)
 Bauerntanz zweier Kinder (1895)
 Bava Bavamaridi (1993)
 Bava Marudula Saval (1988)
 Bava Nachadu (2001)
 Bavagaru Bagunnara? (1998)
 Bavuttiyude Namathil (2012)
 Baw Baw Ka Htaw (2018)
 Bawa Duka (1997)
 Bawa Karma (1997)
 Bawa Thanthayar (1956)
 Bawal (2015)
 Bawal Na Gamot (1994)
 Bawali Unlimited (2012)
 Bawandar (2000)
 Bawarchi (1972)
 The Bawdy Adventures of Tom Jones (1976)
 Bawdy Tales (1973)
 Bawke (2005)
 Bawre Nain (1950)
 Baxter (1989)
 Baxter! (1973)
 The Baxter (2005)
 Baxter, Vera Baxter (1977)
 Baxu and the Giants (2019)
 The Bay (2012)
 Bay of All Saints (2012)
 Bay of Angels (1963)
 A Bay of Blood (1971)
 The Bay Boy (1984)
 The Bay of Death (1926)
 The Bay of Silence (2020)
 The Bay of St Michel (1963)
 Bayalu Daari (1976)
 Bayam Ariyaan (2010)
 Bayam Oru Payanam (2016)
 Bayama Irukku (2017)
 Bayaning 3rd World (1999)
 Bayasade Banda Bhagya (1977)
 Bayen Hath Ka Khel (1985)
 Bayo (1985)
 Bayonet: (1936 & 2018)
 Bayside Shakedown series:
 Bayside Shakedown (1998)
 Bayside Shakedown 2 (2003)
 Bayside Shakedown 3 (2010)
 Bayside Shakedown: The Final (2012)
 The Baytown Outlaws (2012)
 Baywatch (2017)
 Baywatch: Hawaiian Wedding (2003)
 Baywatch the Movie: Forbidden Paradise (1995)
 Bazaar: (1949, 1982 & 2019)
 Bazaar Band Karo (1974)
 Bazaar E Husn (2014)
 Bazaar Rowdy (1988)

Bb-Bc

 Bbuddah... Hoga Terra Baap (2011)
 Bcuz of U (2004)

Be

 Be Beautiful But Shut Up (1958)
 Be Big! (1931)
 Be Careful (2011)
 Be Careful, Grandma! (1960)
 Be Careful, Mr. Smith (1935)
 Be Cool (2005)
 Be Dear to Me (1957)
 Be Forever Yamato (1980)
 Be Here to Love Me (2004)
 Be Human (1936)
 Be Kind Rewind (2008)
 Be Like Others (2008)
 Be with Me (2005)
 Be My Cat: A Film for Anne (2015)
 Be My Guest (1965)
 Be My Husband (1981)
 Be My Slave (2012)
 Be My Wife: (1919 & 1921)
 Be Natural: The Untold Story of Alice Guy-Blaché (2018)
 Be Sick... It's Free (1968)
 Be Silent, My Sorrow, Be Silent (1918)
 Be Somebody (2016)
 Be There or Be Square (1998)
 Be Together (2015)
 Be Up to Date (1938)
 Be Vaghte Talagh (2018)
 Be Water (2020)
 Be Water, My Friend (TBD)
 Be a Wicked Woman (1990)
 Be Your Age (1926)
 Be Yourself! (1930)
 Be-Imaan (1972)
 Be-Lagaam (2002)
 Be-Reham (1980)
 Be-Shaque (1981)

Bea–Beh

 The Beach: (1954 & 2000)
 Beach Blanket Bingo (1965)
 The Beach Bum (2019)
 Beach House (1977)
 The Beach House (2018) (TV)
 The Beach House (2019)
 Beach Party (1963)
 Beaches (1988)
 The Beaches of Agnès (2008)
 The Beales of Grey Gardens (2006)
 Bean (1997)
 Beanpole (2019)
 Beans: (2000 & 2020)
 The Bear: (1938, 1984, 1988, 1998 TV & 2012)
 Bear Nation (2010)
 Bear Witness (2022)
 The Bears and I (1974)
 Beast: (2017, 2022 American & 2022 Indian)
 The Beast: (1974, 1975, 1988, 1996 TV & 2023)
 The Beast from 20,000 Fathoms (1953)
 Beast of Blood (1970)
 The Beast in the Jungle (2023)
 The Beast and the Magic Sword (1983)
 The Beast with Five Fingers (1946)
 The Beast Must Die: (1952 & 1974)
 The Beast Within (1982)
 Beast of the Yellow Night (1971)
 The Beast of Yucca Flats (1961)
 Beasties (1989)
 Beastly (2011)
 Beastly Boyz (2006)
 Beastmaster series:
 The Beastmaster (1982)
 Beastmaster 2: Through the Portal of Time (1991)
 Beastmaster III: The Eye of Braxus (1996) (TV)
 Beasts of No Nation (2015)
 Beasts of the Southern Wild (2012)
 Beat the Devil (1953)
 The Beat Generation (1959)
 Beat Girl (1960)
 The Beat That My Heart Skipped (2005)
 Beatniks (1960)
 Beatrice Cenci: (1909, 1926, 1941, 1956 & 1969)
 Beatrice Wood: Mama of Dada (1993)
 Beats (2019)
 Beau Brummell (1954)
 Beau Geste: (1926, 1939 & 1966)
 Beau Is Afraid (2023)
 Le Beau Serge (1958)
 Beau Travail (1999)
 Beaufort (2008)
 The Beautician and the Beast (1997)
 Beautiful: (2000, 2008, 2009 & 2011)
 Beautiful Boxer (2004)
 Beautiful Boy: (2010 & 2018)
 The Beautiful Country (2004)
 Beautiful Creatures: (2000 & 2013)
 The Beautiful and Damned (1923)
 Beautiful but Dangerous (1955)
 A Beautiful Day in the Neighborhood (2019)
 Beautiful Girls (1996)
 The Beautiful Hen Behind Yao Mountain (2019)
 The Beautiful Lie (1917)
 A Beautiful Mind (2001)
 A Beautiful New World (1999)
 Beautiful People (1999)
 Beautiful Thing (1996)
 Beauty and the Beast: (1934, 1946, 1962, 1978, 1983, 1987, 1991, 1992, 2005, 2009, 2014 & 2017)
 Beauty and the Beast: Belle's Magical World (1998)
 Beauty and the Beast: The Enchanted Christmas (1997)
 Beauty Day (2011)
 Beauty and the Devil (1950)
 The Beauty Jungle (1964)
 Beauty Shop (2005)
 The Beaver (2011)
 Beavis and Butt-head Do America (1996)
 Bébé et fillettes (1896)
 Bébé's Kids (1992)
 Bebo's Girl (1963)
 Because I Said So (2007)
 Because of Winn-Dixie (2005)
 Because of You (1952)
 Because You're Mine (1952)
 Becket: (1924 & 1964)
 Beckett (2021)
 Becky: (1927 & 2020)
 Becky Sharp (1935)
 Becoming Astrid (2018)
 Becoming Bond (2017)
 Becoming Cousteau (2021)
 Becoming Jane (2007)
 Bed and Board (1970)
 Bed and Breakfast: (1930 & 1938)
 Bed of Lies (1992)
 Bed of Roses: (1933 & 1996)
 The Bed Sitting Room (1969)
 Bed and Sofa (1927)
 Bedazzled: (1967 & 2000)
 Bedevil (1993)
 Bedevilled: (1955 & 2010)
 The Bedevilled (1974)
 Bedevilled Rabbit (1957)
 The Bedford Incident (1966)
 Bedknobs and Broomsticks (1971)
 Bedlam: (1946 & 2019)
 The Bedroom Window: (1924 & 1987)
 Bedrooms and Hallways (1998)
 Bedtime for Bonzo (1951)
 Bedtime Stories (2008)
 Bedtime Story: (1938, 1941 & 1964)
 Bee Movie (2007)
 Bee Season (2005)
 Beef (2003)
 Beep Prepared (1961)
 Beer League (2006)
 Beerfest (2006)
 Beethoven series:
 Beethoven (1992)
 Beethoven's 2nd (1993)
 Beethoven's 3rd (2000)
 Beethoven's 4th (2001)
 Beethoven's 5th (2003)
 Beethoven's Big Break (2008)
 Beetlejuice (1988)
 Before and After (1996)
 Before Born (2005)
 Before the Devil Knows You're Dead (2007)
 Before the Fall: (2004 & 2015)
 Before I Disappear (2014)
 Before I Fall (2017)
 Before It Had a Name (2005)
 Before Night Falls (2000)
 Before the Rain: (1994 & 2010)
 Before series:
 Before Sunrise (1995)
 Before Sunset (2004)
 Before Midnight (2013)
 Before Stonewall (1984)
 Before Tomorrow (2008)
 Before We Go (2014)
 Beginners (2010)
 Beginning (2020)
 Beginning of the End (1957)
 The Beguiled: (1971 & 2017)
 Behemoth: (2011 TV & 2015)
 Behind the Curve (2018)
 Behind Enemy Lines series:
 Behind Enemy Lines (2001)
 Behind Enemy Lines: Colombia (2009)
 Behind Enemy Lines II: Axis of Evil (2006)
 Behind the Green Door (1972)
 Behind the High Wall (1956)
 Behind the Lines: (1916 & 1997)
 Behind the Mask: (1932, 1946, 1958, 2002, 2006 & 2021)
 Behind the Mask: The Rise of Leslie Vernon (2006)
 Behind the Red Door (2003)
 Behind the Screen (1916)
 Behind Stone Walls (1932)
 Behind the Sun (2001)
 Behold My Wife!: (1920 & 1934)
 Behold a Pale Horse (1964)

Bei–Bez

 Beijing Bastards (1993)
 Beijing Bicycle (2001)
 Beijing Rocks (2001)
 The Being (1983)
 Being Cyrus (2006)
 Being Evel (2015)
 Being Flynn (2012)
 Being Human (1993)
 Being John Malkovich (1999)
 Being Julia (2004)
 Being Mortal (2023)
 Being the Ricardos (2021)
 Being There (1979)
 "#Beings" (2015)
 Beirut (2018)
 Bela Lugosi Meets a Brooklyn Gorilla (1952)
 Belfast (2021)
 The Believer (2001)
 The Believers (1987)
 Believers (2007)
 The Belko Experiment (2016)
 The Bell from Hell (1973)
 Bell of Purity Temple (1992)
 Bell, Book and Candle (1958)
 Bella (2007)
 Belladonna of Sadness (1973)
 The Bellboy (1960)
 The Bellboy and the Playgirls (1962)
 Belle: (1973, 2013 & 2021)
 Belle de jour (1967)
 Belle of the Nineties (1934)
 La Belle Noiseuse (1991)
 Belle Toujours (2006)
 Belle's Magical World (1998)
 The Belles of St. Clements (1936)
 The Belles of St. Trinian's (1954)
 Belles on Their Toes (1952)
 Bellflower (2011)
 The Bellman (1945)
 Bellman and True (1987)
 The Bells: (1926 & 1931)
 Bells from the Deep: Faith and Superstition in Russia (1993)
 The Bells of St. Mary's (1945)
 Belly (1998)
 The Belly of an Architect (1987)
 Belly of the Beast (2003)
 Bellyfruit (1999)
 Bellyful (2000)
 The Beloved: (1940, 1991, & 2015)
 Beloved: (1934, 1998, & 2011)
 Below (2002)
 Below Her Mouth (2016)
 Belphegor, Ghost of the Louvre (2001)
 Belzebuth (2017)
 Ben and Me (1953)
 Ben X (2007)
 Ben-Hur: (1907, 1959, 2003 & 2016)
 Ben-Hur: A Tale of the Christ (1925)
 Benaam (2006)
 The Benchwarmers (2006)
 Bend It Like Beckham (2002)
 Bend of the River (1952)
 Bending the Rules (2012)
 Bendito infierno (2001)
 Beneath the 12-Mile Reef (1953)
 Beneath Clouds (2002)
 Beneath the Darkness (2012)
 Beneath the Leaves (2019)
 Beneath the Planet of the Apes (1970)
 Beneath Still Waters (2006)
 Beneath the Valley of the Ultra-Vixens (1979)
 Benedetta (2021)
 Benediction (2021)
 Benji series:
 Benji: (1974 & 2018)
 For the Love of Benji (1977)
 Benji's Very Own Christmas Story (1978)
 Oh! Heavenly Dog (1980)
 Benji the Hunted (1987)
 Benji: Off the Leash! (2004)
 Benny & Joon (1993)
 Benny's Video (1992)
 Bent (1997)
 Beongeoli Sam-ryong (1929)
 Beowulf: (1999 & 2007)
 Beowulf & Grendel (2006)
 Bequest to the Nation (1973)
 Berberian Sound Studio (2012)
 Bereavement (2010)
 Beregis Avtomobilya (1966)
 Bergman Island (2021)
 Berkeley Square (1933)
 Berlin Alexanderplatz: (1931, 1980 TV & 2020)
 Berlin Express (1948)
 The Berlin File (2013)
 Berlin, I Love You (2019)
 Berlin: Symphony of a Metropolis (1927)
 The Bermuda Depths (1978)
 The Bermuda Triangle (1978)
 Bernard and the Genie (1991) (TV)
 Bernie: (1996 & 2011)
 Berserker (2001)
 Beshkempir (1998)
 Besieged (1998)
 Best of the Best (1989)
 Best of the Best 2 (1993)
 Best Defense (1984)
 The Best Exotic Marigold Hotel (2012)
 Best Friends: (1975 & 1982)
 The Best Intentions (1992)
 Best Laid Plans (1999)
 The Best Little Whorehouse in Texas (1982)
 The Best Man: (1964, 1998, 1999 & 2005)
 Best Men (1997)
 The Best Plan Is No Plan (2013)
 Best Seller (1987)
 Best in Show (2000)
 The Best Offer (2013)
 The Best of Times: (1981 TV, 1986 & 2002)
 Best Worst Movie (2009)
 The Best Years of Our Lives (1946)
 The Best of Youth (2003)
 La Bestia in calore (1977)
 The Bet: (1997 & 2006)
 Beta (1992)
 The Beta Test (2021)
 La Bête (1975)
 La Bête Humaine (1938)
 Betrayal: (1929, 1932, 1974 TV, 1978 TV, 1981, 1983, 1993, 2009 & 2012)
 The Betrayal: (1948 & 1957)
 Betrayed: (1954 & 1988)
 The Betrayed (1993 & 2008)
 The Betsy (1978)
 Betsy's Wedding (1990)
 A Better Life (2011)
 Better Living Through Chemistry (2014)
 Better Living Through Circuitry (1999)
 Better Luck Tomorrow (2002)
 Better Nate Than Ever (2022)
 Better Off Dead (1985)
 A Better Place (1997)
 Better Than Chocolate (1999)
 A Better Tomorrow (1986)
 A Better Tomorrow II (1987)
 Better Watch Out (2016)
 Bettie Page: Dark Angel (2004)
 Betty (1992)
 Betty Blue (1986)
 The Betty Boop Movie Mystery (1989)
 Between Love and Hate (2006)
 Between Rings (2014)
 Between Showers (1914)
 Between Time and Eternity (1956)
 Between Time and Timbuktu (1972) (TV)
 Between Two Ferns: The Movie (2019)
 Between Two Women: (1937, 1945, 1986 TV & 2000)
 Between Two Worlds: (1919 & 1944)
 Between Us Girls (1942)
 The Beverly Hillbillies (1993)
 Beverly Hills Chihuahua series:
 Beverly Hills Chihuahua (2008)
 Beverly Hills Chihuahua 2 (2011)
 Beverly Hills Chihuahua 3: Viva la Fiesta! (2012)
 Beverly Hills Cop series:
 Beverly Hills Cop (1984)
 Beverly Hills Cop II (1987)
 Beverly Hills Cop III (1994)
 Beverly Hills Ninja (1997)
 Beverly Hills Vamp (1988)
 Bewafa (1952)
 Bewafa Sanam (1995)
 Bewafaa (2005)
 Bewafai (1985) 
 Bewaffa Se Waffa (1992)
 Beware (1946)
 Beware of Children (2019)
 Beware of a Holy Whore (1971)
 Beware, My Lovely (1952)
 Beware! The Blob (1972)
 Beware! Children at Play (1989)
 Bewitched: (1945 & 2005)
 Bewitching Attraction (2006)
 Beyond: (1921, 2010, 2012 & 2014)
 The Beyond (1981)
 Beyond and Back (1978)
 Beyond the Black Rainbow (2010)
 Beyond Borders (2003)
 Beyond the Clouds: (1995 & 2017)
 Beyond the Darkness (1984)
 Beyond the Door: (1974 & 1982)
 Beyond the Door II (1977)
 Beyond the Door III (1989)
 Beyond the Forest (1949)
 Beyond the Gates (2006)
 Beyond Good and Evil (1977)
 Beyond Hatred (2005)
 Beyond the Hill (2012)
 Beyond the Hills (2012)
 Beyond the Last Mountain (1976)
 Beyond the Law: (1934, 1968 American, 1968 Italian, 1993 TV & 2019)
 Beyond the Lights (2014)
 Beyond the Mat (1999)
 Beyond the Poseidon Adventure (1979)
 Beyond the Rainbow (1922)
 Beyond Rangoon (1995)
 Beyond Re-Animator (2003)
 Beyond the Reach (2014)
 Beyond a Reasonable Doubt: (1956 & 2009)
 Beyond the Rocks (1922)
 Beyond the Sea: (1991 & 2004)
 Beyond This Place (1959)
 Beyond the Time Barrier (1960)
 Beyond Tomorrow (1940)
 Beyond the Valley of the Dolls (1970)
 Beyond the Years (2007)
 Bezawada Bebbuli (1983)
 Bezeten, Het Gat in de Muur (1969)
 Bezubaan (1982)
 Bezubaan Ishq (2015)

Bf

 BFF: Best Friends Forever (2009)
 BFFs (2014)
 The BFG: (1989 & 2016)

Bh–Bi

 Bharathi Kannamma (1999)
 Bhoot (2003)
 Bhoot Bungla (1965)
 Bhumika (1977)
 The Bible: In The Beginning (1966)
 Bicentennial Man (1999)
 Les Biches (1968)
 Bichhoo (2000)
 Bichunmoo (2000)
 Bicycle Boy (2015)
 Bicycle Thieves (1948)
 Les Bicyclettes de Belsize (1968)
 Il bidone (1962)
 Big (1988)
 The Big Bad Fox and Other Tales... (2017)
 Big Bad Mama (1974)
 Big Bad Wolf (2006)
 The Big Bad Wolf: (1934 & 2013)
 Big Bad Wolves (2013)
 The Big Bee (2015)
 The Big Blue (1988)
 The Big Bounce: (1960, 1969 & 2004)
 The Big Brawl (1980)
 The Big Broadcast (1932)
 Big Bug Man (2008)
 Big Bullet (1996)
 Big Bully (1996)
 The Big Bus (1976)
 Big Business: (1929 & 1988)
 The Big Chill (1983)
 Big City Blues: (1932 & 1997)
 The Big Clock (1948)
 The Big Combo (1955)
 The Big Country (1958)
 Big Daddy: (1969 & 1999)
 Big Deal After 20 Years (1985)
 Big Deal on Madonna Street (1958)
 The Big Easy (1986)
 Big Eden (2000)
 The Big Empty: (2003 & 2005)
 Big Eyes (2014)
 Big Fan (2009)
 Big Fat Liar (2002)
 The Big Feast (1973)
 Big Fish (2003)
 Big Fish & Begonia (2016)
 The Big Fix: (1947, 1978 & 2012)
 Big Girls Don't Cry (2002)
 The Big Green (1995)
 The Big Gundown (1966)
 A Big Hand for the Little Lady (1966)
 A Big Hand for the Little Lady (1966)
 The Big Heat (1953)
 Big Hero 6 (2014)
 The Big Hit (1998)
 The Big House: (1930 & 2001)
 Big House, U.S.A. (1955)
 Big Jake (1971)
 Big Jim McLain (1952)
 The Big Kahuna (1999)
 The Big Knife (1955)
 Big Leaguer (1953)
 The Big Lebowski (1998)
 Big Legend (2018)
 Big Miracle (2012)
 Big Momma series:
 Big Momma's House (2000)
 Big Momma's House 2 (2006)
 Big Mommas: Like Father, Like Son (2011)
 Big Money Hustlas (2000)
 The Big Mouth (1967)
 Big Night (1996)
 Big Nothing (2006)
 The Big One (1998)
 The Big Parade: (1925 & 1986)
 The Big Picture: (1989 & 2010)
 Big Red (1962)
 Big Red Envelope (2021)
 The Big Red One (1980)
 The Big Risk (1960)
 The Big Road (1934)
 Big Shark (2023)
 The Big Shave (1967)
 The Big Short (2015)
 The Big Shot: (1922, 1931, 1937 & 1942)
 Big Shot's Funeral (2001)
 Big Shots (1987)
 The Big Show: (1923, 1926, 1936, 1960 & 1961)
 The Big Sick (2017)
 The Big Sky (1952)
 The Big Sleep: (1946 & 1978)
 The Big Splash (1935)
 Big Stan (2008)
 The Big Steal (1949)
 The Big Store (1941)
 The Big Swindle (2004)
 Big Time Adolescence (2019)
 Big Top Bunny (1951)
 Big Top Pee-wee (1988)
 The Big Trail (1930)
 Big Trouble: (1986 & 2002)
 Big Trouble in Little China (1986)
 The Big Wedding (2013)
 Big Wednesday (1978)
 The Big Wheel (1949)
 The Big White (2005)
 The Big Year (2011)
 The Bigamist: (1921, 1953 & 1956)
 Bigbug (2022)
 Bigfoot: (1970, 2009 & 2012 TV)
 Bigfoot Junior (2017)
 A Bigger Splash: (1973 & 2015)
 Bigger Than Life (1956)
 Bigger Than the Sky (2005)
 Bigger Than Us (2021)
 The Biggest Little Farm (2018)
 Biggles: Adventures in Time (1986)
 BigLove (2001)
 Biker Boyz (2003)
 Bikini Beach (1964)
 Bilitis (1977)
 Bill: (1981 TV, 2007 & 2015)
 Bill & Ted series:
 Bill & Ted's Excellent Adventure (1989)
 Bill & Ted's Bogus Journey (1991)
 Bill & Ted Face the Music (2020)
 Bill Cosby: Himself (1983)
 A Bill of Divorcement: (1922, 1932 & 1940)
 Bill Nye: Science Guy (2017)
 Bill: On His Own (1983) (TV)
 Billboard Dad (1998) (TV)
 Billion Dollar Brain (1967)
 Billionaire Boys Club: (1987 TV & 2018)
 Billionaire Ransom (2016)
 Billu (2009)
 Billy Bathgate (1991)
 Billy Budd (1962)
 Billy Elliot (2000)
 Billy Jack (1971)
 Billy Jack Goes to Washington (1977)
 Billy the Kid: (1911, 1930, 1941, 1964 & 1989 TV)
 Billy the Kid Returns (1938)
 Billy the Kid Versus Dracula (1966)
 Billy Liar (1963)
 Billy Lynn's Long Halftime Walk (2016)
 Billy Madison (1995)
 Billy's Dad Is a Fudge-Packer (2004)
 Billy's Hollywood Screen Kiss (1998)
 Biloxi Blues (1988)
 Bimmer (2003)
 The Bingo Long Traveling All-Stars & Motor Kings (1976)
 Bintou (2001)
 Bio Zombie (1998)
 Bio-Dome (1996)
 Biography of a Bachelor Girl (1935)
 Biohazard (1985)
 Biohazard 4D-Executer (2000)
 Biohazard: The Alien Force (1994)
 Biohazard: Degeneration (2008)
 Bir (2020)
 Bird: (1988 & 2017)
 Bird Box (2018)
 The Bird with the Crystal Plumage (1970)
 Bird People (2014)
 Bird on a Wire (1990)
 The Birdcage (1996)
 Birdcage Inn (1998)
 Birdemic: Shock and Terror (2010)
 Birdemic 2: The Resurrection (2013)
 Birdman (2014)
 Birdman of Alcatraz (1962)
 The Birds (1963)
 The Birds II: Land's End (1994) (TV)
 Birds Anonymous (1957)
 Birds of Passage (2018)
 Birds of Prey: (1927, 1930, 1973 TV & 2020)
 Birds, Orphans and Fools (1969)
 Birdy (1984)
 Biri Gal (2015)
 Birth: (1984 & 2004)
 The Birth of a Nation: (1915 & 2016)
 Birthday Girl (2001)
 The Birthday Party: (1931 & 1968)
 The Biscuit Eater: (1940 & 1972)
 Bishonen (1998)
 The Bishop's Wife (1947)
 Bitch Slap (2009)
 Bite the Bullet (1975)
 A Bite of China: Celebrating the Chinese New Year (2016)
 Bitter Feast (2010)
 Bitter Harvest: (1963, 1981 TV, 1993 & 2017)
 Bitter Jester (2003)
 Bitter Love (2014)
 Bitter Moon (1992)
 Bitter Rice (1949)
 Bitter Sweet: (1933 & 1940)
 The Bitter Tea of General Yen (1933)
 The Bitter Tears of Petra von Kant (1972)
 A Bittersweet Life (2005)
 Bittersweet Memories (2004)
 Biutiful (2010)
 Le Bivouac (1896)
 Biwi No.1 (1999)
 Bizarre, Bizarre (1937)

BK 

 #BKKY (2016)

Bl–Bm

 Black: (2004, 2005 & 2008)
 Black & White: (1998, 1999 & 2002)
 Black & White Episode I: The Dawn of Assault (2012)
 Black & White: The Dawn of Justice (2014)
 Black '47 (2018)
 Black Adam (2022)
 Black Angel: (1946, 1978 & 1980)
 Black Bear (2020)
 Black Beauty: (1921, 1933, 1946, 1971, 1978 TV, 1987, 1994 & 2020)
 Black Belly of the Tarantula (1971)
 Black Belt Jones (1974)
 Black Book (2006)
 Black Box: (1978, 2002, 2013 & 2020)
 The Black Box: (1915 & 2005)
 Black Bread (2010)
 Black Caesar (1973)
 Black Candles (1982)
 The Black Cannon Incident (1985)
 The Black Cat: (1934, 1941 & 1981)
 Black Cat Mansion (1958)
 Black Cat, White Cat (1998)
 The Black Cauldron (1985)
 Black Chicks Talking (2001)
 Black Christmas: (1974 & 2006)
 Black City (1961)
 Black Cloud (2004)
 Black Coal, Thin Ice (2014)
 Black Coffee: (1931 & 2021)
 The Black Corsair: (1937 & 1976)
 Black Crab (2022)
 The Black Dahlia (2006)
 Black Dalia (2009)
 Black Dawn (2005)
 Black Death (2010)
 Black Dog (1998)
 Black Dynamite (2009)
 Black Eagle (1988)
 Black Emanuelle (1975)
 The Black Forest Girl: (1929, 1933 & 1950)
 The Black Fox (1962)
 Black Fox: The Rise and Fall of Adolf Hitler (1962)
 Black Friday: (1916, 1940, 2004 & 2021)
 Black Girl: (1966 & 1972)
 Black God, White Devil (1964)
 Black Gravel (1961)
 Black Hawk Down (2001)
 Black Hole (2015)
 The Black Hole: (1979, 2006 TV & 2016)
 Black Holes (1995)
 Black House (2007)
 Black Is King (2020)
 Black Jack: (1927, 1950 & 1979)
 Black Knight (2001)
 Black Legion (1937)
 Black Lightning: (1924 & 2009)
 Black Like Me (1964)
 Black Magic: (1929, 1944, 1949, 1975 & 1987)
 Black Mail (1973)
 Black Mama, White Mama (1973)
 The Black Marble (1980)
 The Black Market (1953)
 Black Mask (1996)
 Black Mask 2: City of Masks (2002)
 Black Mass (2015)
 Black Mirror: Bandersnatch (2018)
 Black Moon: (1934 & 1975)
 Black Moon Rising (1986)
 The Black Moses (2013)
 Black Narcissus (1947)
 Black October (2000) (TV)
 Black Orpheus (1959)
 Black Panther (2018)
 Black Panther: Wakanda Forever (2022)
 Black Peter (1964)
 The Black Phone (2021)
 The Black Pierrot: (1913 & 1926)
 The Black Pirate (1926)
 The Black Pirates (1954)
 Black Rain: (1989 American & 1989 Japanese)
 Black Rat (2010)
 Black Republic (1990)
 Black Robe (1991)
 Black Rock (2012)
 Black Rose (2014)
 Black Roses: (1921, 1932, 1935, 1945 & 1988)
 Black Sabbath (1963)
 The Black Scorpion (1957)
 Black Sheep: (1996 & 2006 New Zealand & 2006 German)
 The Black Shield of Falworth (1954)
 Black Snake Moan (2007)
 The Black Stallion (1979)
 Black Stallion (2010)
 Black Sunday: (1960 & 1977)
 The Black Swan (1942)
 Black Swan (2010)
 Black Swans (2005)
 Black Tuesday (1954)
 The Black Vampire (1953)
 Black Water: (2007 & 2018)
 Black Water: Abyss (2020)
 Black and White in Color (1976)
 Black Widow: (1954, 1987, 2005, 2007 TV, 2010 & 2021)
 The Black Widow (1951)
 Black Widow Business (2016)
 The Black Windmill (1974)
 Blackball (2005)
 Blackballed (2004)
 Blackbeard the Pirate (1952)
 Blackbeard's Ghost (1968)
 Blackbird: (2007, 2012, 2013, 2014, 2018 & 2019)
 Blackbirds: (1915 & 1920)
 Blackbirds at Bangpleng (1994)
 Blackboard Jungle (1955)
 Blackenstein (1973)
 Blackfish (2013)
 Blackhat (2015)
 BlacKkKlansman (2018)
 Blacklight (2022)
 Blackmail: (1929, 1939, 1947 & 2005)
 Blackmailed: (1920 & 1951)
 "#BlackSkin" (2022)
 The Blacksmith (1922)
 Blacksmith Scene (1893)
 The Blackout: (1997, 2009 & 2019)
 Blacula (1972)
 Blade (1973)
 The Blade (1995)
 Blade series:
 Blade: (1998 & 2024)
 Blade II (2002)
 Blade: Trinity (2004)
 A Blade in the Dark (1983)
 Blade of Fury (1993)
 The Blade Master (1984)
 Blade of the Ripper (1971)
 Blade Runner series:
 Blade Runner (1982)
 Blade Runner 2049 (2017)
 2036: Nexus Dawn (2017)
 2048: Nowhere to Run (2017)
 Blade Runner Black Out 2022 (2017)
 Blades (1989)
 Blades of Glory (2007)
 Blair Witch (2016)
 The Blair Witch Project (1999)
 Blame It on the Bellboy (1992)
 Blame It on Rio (1984)
 Blancanieves (2012)
 The Blancheville Monster (1963)
 Les Blanchisseuses (1896)
 Blank Check (1994)
 The Blank Generation (1976)
 Blankman (1994)
 Blast From the Past (1999)
 Blast of Silence (1961)
 Blaze: (1989 & 2018)
 Blaze Starr Goes Nudist (1962)
 Blazing Saddles (1974)
 Bleach: Hell Verse (2010)
 Bleak House (1920)
 Bless the Beasts and Children (1971)
 Bless the Child: (2000 & 2003)
 Bless Me, Ultima (2013)
 Blind: (2007, 2011, 2014, 2016, 2019 & 2021)
 Blind Ambition (2021) (TV)
 Blind Beast (1969)
 Blind Chance (1987)
 Blind Date: (1934, 1959, 1984, 1987, 1996, 2007 & 2015)
 Blind Fury (1989)
 Blind Husbands (1919)
 Blind Massage (2014)
 Blind Mountain (2007)
 Blind Shaft (2003)
 The Blind Side (2009)
 Blind Spot: (1932, 1947, 1958, 2009, 2012, 2015, 2017 & 2018)
 Blindness: (2008 & 2016)
 The Bling Ring (2013)
 Blink (1994)
 Bliss: (1917, 1985, 1997 & 2007)
 The Bliss of Mrs. Blossom (1968)
 Blissfully Yours (2002)
 Blithe Spirit: (1945 & 2020)
 Blitz: (2011 & TBD)
 The Blob: (1958 & 1988)
 Block-Heads (1938)
 Blockers (2018)
 Blonde: (1950, 2001 & 2022)
 Blonde Ambition (2007)
 Blonde Venus (1932)
 Blood: (2000, 2004, 2009, 2012 & 2023)
 Blood & Chocolate (2007)
 Blood & Orchids (1986) (TV)
 Blood Alley (1955)
 Blood Bath (1966)
 The Blood Beast Terror (1968)
 Blood of the Beasts (1949)
 Blood and Black Lace (1964)
 Blood and Bone (2009)
 Blood Brothers: (1935, 1975, 1996, 2004, 2007 Chinese, 2007 Indian & 2018)
 The Blood Brothers (1973)
 Blood Debts (1985)
 Blood Diamond (2006)
 Blood Diner (1987)
 Blood for Dracula (1974)
 Blood of Dr. Jekyll (1981)
 Blood of Dracula's Castle (1969)
 Blood Father (2016)
 Blood Feast: (1963 & 1972)
 Blood Feast 2: All U Can Eat (2002)
 The Blood of Fu Manchu (1968)
 Blood Hook (1986)
 Blood Hunters (2016)
 Blood Hunters: Rise of the Hybrids (2019)
 Blood In Blood Out (1993)
 The Blood of Jesus (1941)
 Blood on the Moon (1948)
 Blood from the Mummy's Tomb (1972)
 Blood Oath (1990)
 The Blood of a Poet (1930)
 Blood Rain (2005)
 Blood and Sand (1922)
 The Blood on Satan's Claw (1971)
 Blood Shack (1971)
 Blood Simple (1984)
 The Blood Stained Route Map (2002)
 Blood Sucking Freaks (1976)
 Blood at Sundown (1966)
 Blood Surf (2001)
 Blood Thirst (1971)
 Blood Trails (2006)
 Blood of the Vampire (1958)
 Blood Vessel (2019)
 Blood and Wine (1997)
 Blood on Wolf Mountain (1936)
 Blood Work (2002)
 Blood: The Last Vampire: (2000 & 2009)
 Bloodbath at the House of Death (1983)
 Bloodbeat (1982)
 Bloodbrothers: (1978 & 2005)
 The Bloodhound (2020)
 Bloodhounds of Broadway: (1952 & 1989)
 Bloodhounds of the North (1913)
 Bloodlust! (1961)
 BloodRayne series:
 BloodRayne (2006)
 BloodRayne 2: Deliverance (2008)
 BloodRayne: The Third Reich (2011)
 Bloodsport series:
 Bloodsport (1988)
 Bloodsport II: The Next Kumite (1996)
 Bloodsport III (1997)
 Bloodsport 4: The Dark Kumite (1999)
 The Bloodstained Butterfly (1971)
 The Bloodstained Shadow (1978)
 Bloodthirsty (2020)
 Bloodthirsty Butchers (1970)
 A Bloody Aria (2006)
 Bloody Birthday (1981)
 Bloody Doll (2014)
 The Bloody Judge (1970)
 Bloody Mama (1970)
 Bloody Murder (2000)
 Bloody New Year (1987)
 Bloody Nose, Empty Pockets (2020)
 Bloody Spear at Mount Fuji (1955)
 Bloody Sunday (2002)
 Bloody Tie (2006)
 Bloom in the Moonlight (1993)
 Blossoms in the Dust (1941)
 The Blot (1921)
 The Blot on the Shield (1915)
 Blow (2001)
 Blow Dry (2001)
 Blow Out (1981)
 Blow the Man Down (2020)
 Blowing Wild (1953)
 Blown Away: (1992 & 1994)
 Blowup (1966)
 Blue Bayou (2021)
 Blue Beard (1901)
 Blue Beetle (2023)
 The Blue Bird: (1918, 1940 & 1976)
 Blue Car (2003)
 Blue Chips (1994)
 Blue Collar (1978)
 Blue Collar Comedy Tour: The Movie (2003)
 Blue Crush (2002)
 The Blue Dahlia (1946)
 Blue Desert (1991)
 The Blue Eagle (1930)
 Blue in the Face (1995)
 The Blue Gardenia (1953)
 Blue Hawaii (1961)
 Blue Ice (1993)
 The Blue Iguana (1988)
 Blue Jasmine (2013)
 Blue Jay (2016)
 The Blue Kite (1993)
 The Blue Knight (1973) (TV)
 The Blue Lagoon: (1923, 1949 & 1980)
 The Blue Lamp (1950)
 The Blue Light (1932)
 Blue Lips (2018)
 The Blue Max (1966)
 Blue Money: (1972 & 1985 TV)
 Blue Monkey (1987)
 Blue Mountain State: The Rise of Thadland (2016)
 Blue Movie: (1969 & 1971)
 Blue Murder at St Trinian's (1957)
 The Blue Room: (2002 & 2014)
 Blue Ruin (2013)
 Blue Skies: (1929 & 1946)
 Blue Sky: (1955 & 1994)
 Blue Sky Bones (2014)
 Blue Spring (2002)
 Blue Spring Ride (2014)
 Blue Streak (1999)
 Blue Thunder (1983)
 The Blue Umbrella: (2005 & 2013)
 Blue Valentine (2010)
 The Blue Veil: (1942 & 1951)
 Blue Velvet (1986)
 Blue Velvet Revisited (2016)
 Blue Is the Warmest Colour (2013)
 Bluebeard: (1944, 1951, 1972 & 2009)
 The Blueberry Hunt (2016)
 Blueprint (2003)
 The Blues Brothers (1980) 
 Blues Brothers 2000 (1998)
 Blume in Love (1973)
 Blund's Lullaby (2017)
 BMX Bandits (1983)

Bo

 Bo (2010)
 Bo Burnham: Inside (2021)
 Bo Nay Toe (2019)

Boa-Boz

 Boa... Nguu yak! (2006)
 Boa vs. Python (2004)
 Boadicea (1927)
 Boar (2017)
 Boardinghouse (1983)
 Boardwalk (1979)
 Boarding Gate (2007)
 Boarding House Blues (1948)
 Boarding House Groonen (1925)
 Boarding School (2018)
 Boat: (2007 & 2009)
 The Boat (1921)
 Boat Builders (1938)
 Boat People (1982)
 Boat Trip (2002)
 The Boatniks (1970)
 Bob & Carol & Ted & Alice (1969)
 Bob the High Roller (1955)
 Bob Roberts (1992)
 The Bob's Burgers Movie (2022)
 Bobby: (1973, 2002 & 2006)
 Bobby Deerfield (1977)
 Bobby Fischer Against the World (2011)
 Bobby Jones: Stroke of Genius (2004)
 Bobby's War (1974)
 BoBoiBoy: The Movie (2016)
 BoBoiBoy Movie 2 (2019)
 Bodies Bodies Bodies (2022)
 Bodies, Rest & Motion (1993)
 Body: (2015 American & 2015 Polish)
 The Body: (1970, 1974, 2001, 2012 & 2018)
 Body Double (1984)
 Body of Evidence: (1988 TV & 1993)
 Body God (2022)
 Body Heat (1981)
 Body Jumper (2001)
 Body of Lies (2008)
 Body of My Enemy (1976)
 Body Parts (1991)
 Body Shots (2000)
 The Body Snatcher (1946)
 Body Snatchers (1993)
 Body and Soul: (1925, 1927, 1931, 1947, 1981 & 1999)
 Body Without Soul (1994)
 Bodyguard: (2010 & 2011 Hindi)
 The Bodyguard: (1992 & 2004)
 The Bodyguard 2 (2007)
 Bodyguard Kiba: (1973 & 1993)
 Bodyguard Kiba: Apocalypse of Carnage (1994)
 Bodyguard Kiba: Apocalypse of Carnage 2 (1995)
 Boeing Boeing: (1965 & 1985)
 Boggy Creek (2011)
 Boggy Creek II: And the Legend Continues (1985)
 The Bogie Man (1992 TV)
 Bogus (1996)
 The Bohemian Girl: (1922 & 1936)
 Bohemian Rhapsody (2018)
 La Bohème: (1926 & 1965)
 Boiler Room (2000)
 Boiling Point: (1990, 1993 & 2021)
 Bois de Boulogne (1896)
 Bol (2011)
 Bolero: (1934, 1942 & 1984)
 Bollywood/Hollywood (2002)
 Bolshevism on Trial (1919)
 Bolt: (1994 & 2008)
 A Bolt from the Blue (2014)
 Bolívar Soy Yo (2002)
 Bolivia (2002)
 Bombay Talkies (2013)
 Bombshell: (1933, 1997 & 2019)
 Un bon bock (1892)
 Bon Cop, Bad Cop (2006)
 Bon Voyage: (1944, 1954, 2003 & 2006)
 Bon Voyage, Charlie Brown (and Don't Come Back!!) (1980)
 Bon Voyage! (1962)
 Bonded by Blood (2010)
 Bone (1972)
 The Bone Collector (1997)
 Bone Tomahawk (2015)
 Bones: (2001 & 2010)
 Bones and All (2022)
 The Bonfire of the Vanities (1990)
 Bongoland (2003)
 Bongwater (1997)
 Le Bonheur: (1934 & 1965)
 Bonjour Monsieur Shlomi (2003)
 Bonjour tristesse (1958)
 Bonneville (2006)
 Bonnie and Clyde (1967)
 Bonzo Goes to College (1952)
 Boo (2005)
 Boo! A Madea Halloween (2016)
 Boo 2! A Madea Halloween (2017)
 The Boogens (1981)
 Boogeyman (2005)
 Boogeyman 2 (2007)
 Boogeyman 3 (2008)
 Boogeyman II (1983)
 Boogie Man: The Lee Atwater Story (2008)
 The Boogie Man Will Get You (1942)
 Boogie Nights (1997)
 Book Club (2018)
 The Book of Eli (2010)
 The Book of Fish (2021)
 The Book of Gabrielle (2016)
 The Book of Life: (1998, 2014 & 2016)
 Book of Love: (1990, 2002, 2004 & 2016)
 Book of Shadows: Blair Witch 2 (2000)
 The Book Thief (2013)
 Booksmart (2019)
 Boom Town (1940)
 Boomerang: (1934, 1947, 1976, 1992, 2001, 2015 & 2019)
 The Boomerang: (1919 & 1925)
 The Boondock Saints (1999)
 The Boondock Saints II: All Saints Day (2009)
 Boonie Bears series:
 Boonie Bears: To the Rescue (2014)
 Boonie Bears: Mystical Winter (2015)
 Boonie Bears III (2016)
 Boonie Bears: Entangled Worlds (2017)
 Boonie Bears: The Wild Life (2021)
 Boonie Bears: Back to Earth (2022)
 Das Boot (1981)
 Boot Hill (1969)
 Booty Call (1997)
 BoOzy' OS and the Cristal Gem (2013)
 Borat: Cultural Learnings of America for Make Benefit Glorious Nation of Kazakhstan (2006)
 Borat Subsequent Moviefilm (2020)
 Bordello of Blood (1996)
 Border: (1997 & 2007)
 The Border: (1982, 1996, 2007 & 2009)
 Border Incident (1949)
 Border Radio (1987)
 Border River (1954)
 Border War: The Battle Over Illegal Immigration (2006)
 Borderland: (1922, 1937 & 2007)
 Borderlands (TBD)
 The Borderlands (2013)
 Borderline: (1930, 1950, 1980 & 2008)
 Bordertown: (1935 & 2007)
 Borg vs McEnroe (2017)
 Borgman (2013)
 Boris and Natasha: The Movie (1992)
 Born to Be Blue (2015)
 Born into Brothels (2004)
 Born in China (2016)
 Born to Dance (1936)
 Born in East L.A. (1987)
 Born to Fight: (1936, 1984, 1989 & 2004)
 Born in Flames (1983)
 Born on the Fourth of July (1989)
 Born Free (1966)
 Born of Hope (2009)
 Born to Kill: (1947, 1967, 1974 & 1996)
 The Born Losers (1967)
 Born to Sing: (1942 & 2013)
 Born to Be Wild: (1995 & 2011)
 Born to Win (1971)
 Born Yesterday: (1950 & 1993)
 The Borrower (1991)
 The Borrowers: (1973 TV, 1997 & 2011 TV)
 Borsalino (1970)
 Borsalino & Co. (1974)
 Bos (2017)
 The Boss Baby (2017)
 The Boss Baby: Family Business (2021)
 Boss Level (2021)
 Boss Nigger (1975)
 The Boston Strangler (1968)
 The Boston Tea Party: (1908 & 1915)
 The Bostonians (1984)
 Botched (2008)
 Both Sides of the Blade (2022)
 The Bothersome Man (2007)
 A Bottle in the Gaza Sea (2011)
 Bottle Rocket (1996)
 Bottle Shock (2008)
 Bottom of the 9th (2019)
 Bottoms Up: (1934, 1960 & 2006)
 Boudu Saved from Drowning (1932)
 Boulevard des Italiens (1896)
 Bounce (2000)
 Bound (1996 & 2015)
 Bound for Glory (1976)
 The Boundary (2014)
 The Bounty: (1984 & 2012)
 The Bounty Hunter: (1954 & 2010)
 Bounty Hunters (2016)
 Bounty Killer (2013)
 The Bourne Identity (1988 TV)
 Bourne series:
 The Bourne Identity (2002)
 The Bourne Supremacy (2004)
 The Bourne Ultimatum (2007)
 The Bourne Legacy (2012)
 Jason Bourne (2016)
 The Bow (2005)
 The Bowery (1933)
 Bowery Blitzkrieg (1941)
 Bowfinger (1999)
 Bowling for Columbine (2002)
 The Box: (1967, 1976, 2003, 2007, 2009, 2021 Mexican & 2021 South Korean)
 Box of Moon Light (1997)
 Boxcar Bertha (1972)
 Das Boxende Känguruh (1895)
 Boxer: (1984, 2015 & 2018)
 The Boxer: (1958, 1997 & 2012)
 The Boxer's Bride (1926)
 The Boxer's Omen (1983)
 Boxing Helena (1993)
 The Boxing Kangaroo (1896)
 Boxing Match; or, Glove Contest (1896)
 The Boxtrolls (2014)
 Boy: (1969, 2009 & 2010)
 The Boy: (2015 & 2016)
 Boy A (2008)
 The Boy and the Beast (2015)
 The Boy Behind the Door (2020)
 The Boy in Blue: (1919 & 1986)
 A Boy Called Christmas (2021)
 A Boy Called Dad (2009)
 A Boy Called H (2013)
 A Boy Called Hate (1995)
 A Boy Called Po (2016)
 A Boy Called Sailboat (2018)
 Boy Called Twist (2004)
 Boy on a Dolphin (1957)
 Boy Erased (2018)
 The Boy Friend: (1926 & 1971)
 Boy Goes to Heaven (2005)
 A Boy and His Dog: (1946 short & 1976)
 Boy Meets Dog (1938)
 Boy Meets Girl: (1938, 1982, 1984, 1998 & 2014)
 A Boy Named Charlie Brown (1969)
 A Boy Named Sue (2001)
 The Boy Next Door (2015)
 The Boy in the Plastic Bubble (1976)
 The Boy in the Striped Pajamas (2008)
 Boy Trouble (1939)
 The Boy Turns Man (1972)
 The Boy Who Could Fly (1986)
 The Boy Who Cried Werewolf: (1973 & 2010 TV)
 The Boy Who Harnessed the Wind (2019)
 The Boy Who Talked to Badgers (1975)
 Boyfriends (1996)
 Boyhood: (1951 & 2014)
 Boys: (1977, 1983, 1990, 1996 & 2003)
 The Boys: (1962 British, 1962 Finnish, 1991 & 1998)
 The Boys in the Band: (1970 & 2020)
 The Boys from Brazil (1978)
 Boys of the City (1940)
 The Boys in Company C (1978)
 Boys from County Hell (2021)
 Boys Don't Cry: (1999 & 2000)
 The Boys from Fengkuei (1983)
 Boys and Girls: (1983 & 2000)
 The Boys Next Door: (1985 & 1996 TV)
 Boys on the Side (1995)
 Boys State (2020)
 Boys from the Streets (1949)
 Boys Town (1938)
 Boys in the Trees (2016)
 The Boys Who Cried Wolf (2015)
 Boys Will Be Boys: (1921 & 1935)
 The Boys: The Sherman Brothers' Story (2009)
 Boys' Night Out (1962)
 Boyz n the Hood (1991)
 Boyz in the Wood (2019)
 Bozo (2013)

Br

 Brad's Status (2017)
 The Brady Bunch Movie (1995)
 The Brady Bunch in the White House (2002) (TV)
 Brahms: The Boy II (2020)
 Kids in the Hall: Brain Candy (1996)
 Brain Damage (1988)
 Brain Donors (1992)
 Brain on Fire (2016)
 The Brain That Wouldn't Die (1962)
 Braindead (1992)
 Brainscan (1994)
 Brainstorm: (1965, 1983 & 2000)
 Brainwashed (1960)
 Brake (2012)
 Bram Stoker's Dracula: (1974 TV & 1992)
 Bran Nue Dae (2010)
 The Brand New Testament (2015)
 Brand Upon the Brain! (2006)
 Branded to Kill (1967)
 Brannigan (1975)
 Brass Commandments (1923)
 Brass Knuckles (1927)
 Brass Target (1978)
 The Brass Teapot (2012)
 Brassed Off (1996)
 Bratz: The Movie (2007)
 The Bravados (1958)
 Brave: (1994, 2012 & 2014)
 The Brave (1997)
 The Brave Archer (1977)
 The Brave Archer 2 (1978)
 The Brave Archer 3 (1981)
 The Brave Archer and His Mate (1982)
 The Brave Little Toaster (1987)
 The Brave Little Toaster Goes to Mars (1988)
 The Brave Little Toaster to the Rescue (1989)
 The Brave One: (1956 & 2007)
 Brave Rabbit 2 Crazy Circus (2015)
 Braveheart: (1925 & 1995)
 Bravetown (2015)
 Bravo My Life (2007)
 Bravo, My Life (2005)
 Brawl in Cell Block 99 (2017)
 Brazil: (1944 & 1985)
 Breach: (2007 & 2020)
 Bread and Roses: (1967, 1994 & 2000)
 Bread and Tulips (2000)
 Bread, Love and Dreams (1953)
 The Breadwinner (2017)
 Break Out (2002)
 The Break-Up (2006)
 The Break-up Season (2014)
 Breakable You (2017)
 Breakdown: (1952, 1997 & 2016)
 Breakdown: In Your House (1998)
 Breaker Morant (1980)
 Breakfast of Champions (1999)
 The Breakfast Club (1985)
 Breakfast on Pluto (2005)
 Breakfast at Tiffany's (1961)
 Breakheart Pass (1975)
 Breakin' (1984)
 Breakin' 2: Electric Boogaloo (1984)
 Breakin' All the Rules (2004)
 Breaking (2022)
 Breaking Away (1979)
 Breaking and Entering (2006)
 Breaking In: (1989 & 2018)
 Breaking with Old Ideas (1975)
 Breaking Up: (1985 & 1997)
 Breaking the Waves (1996)
 Breakthrough: (1950, 1979, 1986 & 2019)
 Breast Men (1997)
 Breathe: (2009, 2014 & 2017)
 Breathe In (2013)
 Breathing Room (2008)
 Breathless: (1960, 1983 & 2009)
 The Breed: (2001 & 2006)
 Breeders (1986)
 Breezy (1974)
 The Bremen Town Musicians (1969)
 Brewster McCloud (1971)
 Brewster's Millions: (1914, 1921, 1935, 1945 & 1985)
 Brian and Charles (2022)
 Brian's Song: (1971 TV & 2001 TV)
 Brice de Nice (2005)
 Brick (2006)
 Brick Mansions (2014)
 The Bride: (1973, 1985, 2015 & 2017)
 The Bride and the Beast (1958)
 Bride of Boogedy (1987)
 The Bride Came C.O.D. (1941)
 Bride of Chucky (1998)
 The Bride Comes Home (1935)
 Bride of Frankenstein (1935)
 Bride of the Gorilla (1951)
 Bride of the Monster (1956)
 Bride and Prejudice (2004)
 Bride of Re-Animator (1990)
 A Bride for Rip Van Winkle (2016)
 Bride of the Wind (2001)
 Bride Wars: (2009 & 2015)
 The Bride with White Hair (1993)
 The Bride with White Hair 2 (1993)
 The Bride Wore Black (1968)
 Brides: (2004 & 2014)
 The Brides of Dracula (1960)
 The Brides of Fu Manchu (1966)
 Brideshead Revisited (2008)
 Bridesmaids: (1989 & 2011)
 The Bridge: (1959, 1992 & 2006)
 Bridge: (1949 & 1988)
 The Bridge at Remagen (1969)
 The Bridge on the River Kwai (1957)
 The Bridge of San Luis Rey: (1929, 1944 & 2004)
 A Bridge to Terabithia: (1985 TV & 2007)
 A Bridge Too Far (1977)
 The Bridges of Madison County (1995)
 The Bridges at Toko-Ri (1954)
 Bridget Joness series:
 Bridget Jones's Diary (2001)
 Bridget Jones: The Edge of Reason (2004)
 Bridget Jones's Baby (2016)
 Brief Encounter (1945)
 A Brief History of Time (1992)
 Brief Interviews with Hideous Men (2009)
 Brief Season (1969)
 A Brief Vacation (1973)
 Brigadoon (1954)
 Bright Eyes: (1929 & 1934)
 Bright Leaf (1950)
 Bright Lights (1935)
 Bright Lights, Big City (1988)
 Bright Lights: Starring Carrie Fisher and Debbie Reynolds (2016)
 Bright Star (2009)
 Bright Victory (1951)
 Bright Young Things (2003)
 Brightburn (2019)
 Brighton 4th (2021)
 Brighton Beach Memoirs (1986)
 Brighton Rock: (1948 & 2010)
 Brilliantovaya ruka (1968)
 Bring It On series:
 Bring It On (2000)
 Bring It On Again (2004)
 Bring It On: All or Nothing (2006)
 Bring It On: In It to Win It (2007)
 Bring It On: Fight to the Finish (2009)
 Bring It On: Worldwide Cheersmack (2017)
 Bring Me the Head of Alfredo Garcia (1974)
 Bring On the Night (1985)
 Bringing Down the House (2003)
 Bringing Out the Dead (1999)
 Bringing Up Baby (1938)
 The Brink: (2017 & 2019)
 Brink! (1998)
 The Brink's Job (1978)
 Broadcast News (1987)
 Broadcast Signal Intrusion (2021)
 Broadway Bill (1934)
 Broadway Danny Rose (1984)
 Broadway Melody series:
 The Broadway Melody (1929)
 Broadway Melody of 1936 (1936)
 Broadway Melody of 1938 (1937)
 Broadway Melody of 1940 (1940)
 Broke Sky (2007)
 Brokeback Mountain (2005)
 Brokedown Palace (1999)
 The Broken (2008)
 Broken: (1993, 2005, 2006, 2012, 2013 & 2014)
 Broken Arrow: (1950 & 1996)
 Broken Blossoms (1919)
 Broken Bridges (2006)
 The Broken Circle Breakdown (2012)
 Broken City (2013)
 The Broken Cross: (1911 & 1916)
 Broken Embraces (2009)
 Broken English: (1981, 1996 & 2007)
 Broken Flowers (2005)
 The Broken Hearts Club: A Romantic Comedy (2000)
 Broken Lance (1954)
 Broken Lullaby (1932)
 Broken Trail (2006) (TV)
 Broker: (2010 & 2022)
 Bronco Billy (1980)
 Bronson (2008)
 The Brontë Sisters (1979)
 A Bronx Morning (1931)
 A Bronx Tale (1993)
 The Brood (1979)
 Brooklyn (2015)
 Brooklyn Rules (2009)
 Brooklyn's Finest (2009)
 Bros (2022)
 Brother: (1997 & 2000)
 The Brother from Another Planet (1984)
 Brother Bear (2003)
 Brother Bear 2 (2006)
 Brother to Brother (2004)
 Brother Future (1991)
 Brother Orchid (1940)
 Brother Rat (1938)
 Brother and Sister: (1976, 2010 & 2022)
 Brother Sun, Sister Moon (1972)
 The Brotherhood of the Bell (1970) (TV)
 Brotherhood of Blades (2014)
 Brotherhood of Blades II: The Infernal Battlefield (2017)
 Brotherhood of Blood (2007)
 The Brotherhood of Satan (1971)
 Brotherhood of the Wolf (2001)
 Brothers: (1913, 1929, 1930, 1977, 1982 TV, 2004, 2007, 2009, 2015, 2016, 2017 adventure, 2017 drama & TBD)
 The Brothers: (1947, 1973, 1979 & 2001)
 The Brothers Bloom (2009)
 The Brothers Grimm (2005)
 Brothers in Law (1957)
 The Brothers Lionheart (1977)
 The Brothers McMullen (1995)
 Brothers and Sisters: (1980 & 1992)
 Brothers and Sisters of the Toda Family (1941)
 The Brothers Solomon (2007)
 Brothers Till We Die (1977)
 Brothers at War (2009)
 The Brown Bunny (2003)
 Brown Girl Begins (2017)
 Brown Sugar: (1922, 1931 & 2002)
 The Brown Wallet (1936)
 Brown's Requiem (1998)
 The Browning Version: (1951 & 1994)
 Brubaker (1980)
 Bruce Almighty (2003)
 Bruce and Pepper Wayne Gacy's Home Movies (1989)
 Die Brücke (1961)
 Bruiser (2000)
 Brüno (2009)
 Brussels by Night (1983)
 The Brute: (1914, 1920, 1927 & 1961)
 Brute Force: (1914 & 1947)
 El Bruto (1953)
 Brutus: (1911 & 2016)

Bu–By

 The 'Burbs (1989)
 Bubba Ho-tep (2002)
 Bubble (2005)
 The Bubble: (1966, 2001, 2006 & 2022)
 Bubble Boy (2001)
 Bubble Fiction: Boom or Bust (2007)
 The Buccaneer: (1938 & 1958)
 Buccaneer's Girl (1950)
 The Buccaneers (1924)
 Buchanan's Wife (1918)
 Buck (2011)
 Buck and the Preacher (1972)
 Buck Privates (1941)
 Buck Privates Come Home (1947)
 A Bucket of Blood: (1959 & 1995)
 The Bucket List (2007)
 Bucking Broadway (1917)
 Bucky Larson: Born to Be a Star (2011)
 Budapest (2018)
 Budbringeren (1998)
 Buddha Mountain (2010)
 Buddy Buddy (1981)
 The Buddy Holly Story (1978)
 Buddymoon (2016)
 Buddies in India (2016)
 Budo: The Art of Killing (1978)
 Buena Vista Social Club (1999)
 Buffalo '66 (1998)
 Buffalo Bill and the Indians, or Sitting Bull's History Lesson (1976)
 The Buffalo Boy (2004)
 Buffalo Dreams (2005)
 Buffalo Soldier (1970)
 Buffalo Soldiers: (1997 TV & 2001)
 Buffet Froid (1979)
 Buffy the Vampire Slayer (1992)
 Bug: (1975, 2002 & 2006)
 A Bug's Life (1998)
 Bugged! (1997)
 Bugs: (2003 & 2014)
 Bugsy (1991)
 Bugsy Malone (1976)
 Bukowski (1973)
 Bulbul: (2013 & 2019)
 Bulbul Can Sing (2018)
 Bull: (1965, 2019 & 2021)
 Bull Durham (1988)
 Bulldog Drummond series:
 Bulldog Drummond: (1922 & 1929)
 Bulldog Jack (1935)
 Bulldog Drummond's Revenge (1937)
 Bulldog Drummond's Secret Police (1939)
 Bulldog Drummond's Third Round (1925)
 Bullet Ballet (1998)
 A Bullet for the General (1966)
 Bullet in the Head (1990)
 A Bullet in the Head (1990)
 Bullet to the Head (2012)
 A Bullet in the Heart (1944)
 A Bullet for Joey (1955)
 Bullet Train (2022)
 The Bullet Vanishes (2012)
 Bulletproof: (1988 & 1996)
 Bulletproof Monk (2003)
 Bullets or Ballots (1936)
 Bullets of Justice (2019)
 Bullets Over Broadway (1994)
 Bullfighter and the Lady (1951)
 The Bullfighters (1945)
 Bullhead (2012)
 Bullitt (1968)
 Bullshot (1983)
 Bully: (2001 & 2011)
 Bulworth (1998)
 Bumblebee (2018)
 Bungee Jumping of Their Own (2001)
 The Bunker: (1981 TV & 2001)
 Bunker Bean (1936)
 Bunny and the Bull (2009)
 The Bunny Game (2010)
 Bunny the Killer Thing (2015)
 Bunny Lake Is Missing (1965)
 Bunnyman (2011)
 Bunnyman 2 (2014)
 Bunraku (2011)
 Bunshinsaba (2004)
 Buñuel in the Labyrinth of the Turtles (2018)
 Buppah Rahtree (2003)
 Buppah Rahtree Phase 2: Rahtree Returns (2005)
 Burden of Dreams (1982)
 Burglar (1987)
 The Burial (TBD)
 Burial Ground (1981)
 Buried (2010)
 Buried on Sunday (1992)
 Buriki no kunsho (1981)
 Burke & Hare: (1972 & 2010)
 Burlesque: (2010 American & 2010 Australian)
 A Burlesque on Carmen (1915)
 The Burmese Harp: (1956 & 1985)
 Burn After Reading (2008)
 Burn! (1970)
 Burn Out (2018)
 The Burned Barns (1973)
 Burning (2018)
 The Burning (1981)
 The Burning Bed (1984) (TV)
 Burning Paradise (1994)
 The Burning Plain (2008)
 The Burning Season: (1994 TV & 2008)
 The Burning Soil (1922)
 Burnt (2015)
 Burnt Money (2000)
 Burnt Offerings (1976)
 Burnt by the Sun (1995)
 Burroughs: The Movie (1983)
 Bury My Heart at Wounded Knee (2007) (TV)
 Bus 174 (2003)
 Bus Driver (2016)
 Bus Stop: (1956 & 2012)
 The Bus Uncle (2006)
 The Bushido Blade (1981)
 Bushido, Samurai Saga (1963)
 Bushwacked (1995)
 The Business (2005)
 Business Is Business (1971)
 The Business of Strangers (2002)
 Business as Usual (1987)
 Buster (1988)
 Buster's Mal Heart (2016)
 Bustin' Loose (1981)
 Busting (1974)
 A Busy Day (1914)
 A Busy Night (2016)
 But Always (2014)
 But I'm a Cheerleader (1999)
 Butch Cassidy and the Sundance Kid (1969)
 The Butcher: (1970 & 2009)
 The Butcher Boy: (1917 & 1997)
 Butcher, Baker, Nightmare Maker (1981)
 The Butcher's Wife (1991)
 The Butler (2013)
 Butter: (1998 & 2011)
 Butter Battle Book (1989)
 Butter on the Latch (2013)
 Butterfield 8 (1960)
 Butterflies Are Free (1972)
 The Butterfly Effect series:
 The Butterfly Effect (2004)
 The Butterfly Effect 2 (2006)
 The Butterfly Effect 3: Revelations (2009)
 Butterfly and Flowers (1985)
 Butterfly Kiss (1995)
 The Butterfly Tattoo (2008)
 Butterfly Tongues (1999)
 The Butterfly Tree (2017)
 Butterfly on a Wheel (2007)
 The Butterfly on the Wheel (1915)
 The Butterfly's Dream: (1994 & 2013)
 Buud Yam (1997)
 Buzz Lightyear of Star Command: The Adventure Begins (2000)
 Buzzard (2014)
 Bwana Devil (1952)
 By the Bluest of Seas (1936)
 By Candlelight (1933)
 By the Grace of God (2019)
 By Touch (1986)
 Bye (2019)
 Bye Bye Birdie: (1963 & 1995 TV)
 Bye Bye Love (1995)
 The Bye Bye Man (2017)
 Bye Bye Monkey (1978)
 Byleth: The Demon of Incest (1972)
 Byzantium (2012)

Previous:  List of films: A    Next:  List of films: C

See also
 Lists of films
 Lists of actors
 List of film and television directors
 List of documentary films
 List of film production companies

-